Kannada Virtual University (KVU) (Kannada lang: Kannada Vastavopama Vishwavidyalaya):  The Department of Kannada and Culture's plan to establish a Kannada Virtual University (KVU) on the lines of the Tamil Virtual Academy (TVA) has gained momentum with Kannada Software Development Committee (KSDC) recently deciding to submit a proposal to the government on the matter.

Though the KSDC recommended setting up of the KVU in its report submitted in 2010, the plan has been lying in cold storage, allegedly because of the apathy of the previous BJP dispensation and the present Congress government.

The government approving the project now will be considered as a gift to the people at a time the State celebrates the 60th Kannada Rajyotsava.

At its recent meeting, the KSDC decided to take forward the plan of setting up the KVU and submit a detailed project report (DPR) to the government shortly. "We are optimistic about getting positive response from the government," said K.A. Dayanand, Director, Kannada and Culture.
According to Chidananda Gowda, president of the KSDC who visited the TVA and studied its model, Tamilians living outside Tamil Nadu have been benefiting from the TVA to a large extent. Similarly, the KVU will be a boon to the Kannada diaspora, he said.

Internet-based resources

Once the KVU or Kannada Vastavopama Vishwavidyalaya is established, Kannada community living in different parts of the globe, as well as others interested in learning the language and acquiring knowledge on the history, art, literature and culture of Kannadigas will get Internet-based resources, he explained.

The KVU will help in developing and delivering Internet-based learning material in Kannada, customised programmes to meet the cultural needs, and initiate and continue measures to coordinate and pool together knowledge resources, besides offering academic programmes in Kannada and awarding certificate, diploma and degree on completion of prescribed requirements, said a member of the KSDC on condition of anonymity.

He said that had the government acted immediately after the KSDC submitted its report in 2010, the process of establishing the KVU would have commenced by now. "Even now it is not too late. If the department takes the initiative after getting approval from the government, it could be possible to put a skeletal structure in place by the Kannada Rajyotsava," he said.

Tamil Virtual Academy

Tamil Nadu government established the Tamil Virtual University in 2001 and renamed it later as Tamil Virtual Academy (TVA).

The TVA is providing Internet-based resources and opportunities for Tamil communities living in different parts of the globe, as well as others interested in learning Tamil, science, technology, Tamil computing software and acquiring knowledge on the history, art, literature and culture of Tamils.
The academy awards certificate, diploma and degree through Tamil University on completion of the prescribed requirements.

External links
http://www.thehindu.com/news/national/karnataka/plan-for-kannada-virtual-university-gains-momentum/article7800637.ece
http://tamilnadu.indiaeveryday.in/news-plan-for-kannada-virtual-university-gains-momentum-1129-1236118.htm
http://interceder.net/latest_news/Kannada-Virtual-University
http://www.dailyindianews.com/news/plan-for-kannada-virtual-university-gains-momentum

Universities in Karnataka
Distance education institutions based in India
Dravidian studies